The M58 Wolf is an agile, armored mobile and reconnaissance vehicle of the United States Army, capable of producing smoke screens to block both visual and infrared detection. Large area multispectral obscurant smoke screening is used to cover the tracks of troops and artillery.

Construction

The M58 system is made up of an M56 smoke generation unit built onto an M113 type chassis. The M113 chassis was designed as a fully tracked armoured personnel carrier, light enough to be transported via airplane, yet still moderately armored.  The vehicle can carry a payload of cargo, troops, and a crew of three.

With its mechanical foundation based on an upgraded  diesel engine, four speed hydrostatic transmission, and large external fuel tanks it is capable of providing side-by-side support with even the most agile Abrams and Bradley AFVs.

Smoke generation
Without replenishment of smoke producing agents, the M58 can produce ninety minutes of thick, visually impairing smoke, or thirty minutes of infra-red obscuring haze. This screen effectively blocks infrared range finding as well as conventional night vision technologies. A future smoke capability, based on millimeter wave technology, could also be used to block higher-frequency radar systems. 

The system generates smoke by vaporizing medium viscosity oil in a specially designed exhaust manifold. The hot vapors form a thick, white cloud. Other components may be added to the oil to form different types of cloaking hazes. Infrared smoke has special components added so that infrared light is refracted along with the full visual spectrum.

Purpose of a smoke platoon
A chemical smoke platoon is designed to mask the maneuvers of ground forces during reconnaissance, recovery, and insertion missions. The designated primary mission of the M58 Wolf is provide troop cover, counter electronic sensors, munitions guidance systems, and standard night vision. All forms of pinpointing things within the thick smoke cloud are effectively blocked. The best the enemy can do in this situation is to blanket the smoky area with rounds, which would ultimately lead to few kills and much wasted ammunition. By blinding the enemy, countermeasures, such as laser guided missiles, are warded off; the obscured troops are safer and have the element of surprise on their side.

A typical platoon of seven M58 vehicles acts as cover support on tactical missions. Two groups of three M58 Wolves create a perimeter, circling troops and vehicles which are to be hidden. The seventh vehicle leads the platoon, coordinating maneuvers that provide the thickest and largest area of cover.

See also 
 M56 Coyote

References
 M58 Wolf Smoke Generator System on FAS
 M58 Wolf System
 Deployment Printout
 Image of the M58 Wolf System

Military vehicles introduced in the 1990s
Weapons countermeasures
Smoke
Tracked military vehicles
United States Army vehicles